Whiff is a common name for various species of flatfish. It may refer to:

 Whiff or Megrim (Lepidorhombus whiffiagonis), a species of flatfish in the family Scophthalmidae
 Anglefin whiff (Citharichthys gymnorhinus), a species of flatfish in the family Paralichthyidae
 Horned whiff (Citharichthys cornutus), a species of flatfish in the family Paralichthyidae
 Sand whiff (Citharichthys arenaceus), a species of flatfish in the family Paralichthyidae
 Veracruz whiff (Citharichthys abbotti), a species of flatfish in the family Paralichthyidae

Other uses
 Whiff (Thomas & Friends), a fictional steam engine
 Whiff (baseball), a baseball term
 A stroke in multiple sports, including golf and tennis, whereby the player misses the ball completely
 An odor
 One or more possible whiffs of oxygen before the great oxidation event

See also
 WIFF (disambiguation)